Grębów  is a village in Tarnobrzeg County, Subcarpathian Voivodeship, in south-eastern Poland. It is the seat of the gmina (administrative district) called Gmina Grębów. It is a railroad junction of secondary importance, with lines stemming into three directions - northwest towards Sandomierz, west towards Sobów, and east, towards Stalowa Wola - Rozwadów.

The village has a population of 3,000.

References

Villages in Tarnobrzeg County